Cedarville is an unincorporated community in Whatcom County, in the U.S. state of Washington.

The community took its name from the Cedarville Shingle Company.

References

Unincorporated communities in Whatcom County, Washington
Unincorporated communities in Washington (state)